The 1965 College Football All-America team is composed of college football players who were selected as All-Americans by various organizations that chose College Football All-America Teams in 1965.

The NCAA recognizes six selectors as "official" for the 1965 season.  They are (1) the American Football Coaches Association (AFCA), (2) the Associated Press (AP), (3) the Central Press Association (CP), (4) the Football Writers Association of America (FWAA), (5) the Newspaper Enterprise Association (NEA), and (6) the United Press International (UPI). Four of the six teams (AP, UPI, NEA, and FWAA) were selected by polling of sports writers and/or broadcasters. The CP team was selected with input from the captains of the major college teams.  The AFCA team was based on a poll of more than 500 coaches.  Other notable selectors, though not recognized by the NCAA as official, included The Football News (FN), a weekly national football newspaper, Time magazine, The Sporting News (TSN), and the Walter Camp Football Foundation (WC).

Three players were unanimously selected as first-team players by all six official selectors as well as the four unofficial selectors. They are: (1) USC running back Mike Garrett who led the NCAA with 1,440 rushing yards and won the 1965 Heisman Trophy; (2) Tulsa end Howard Twilley who in 1965 set an NCAA record with 1,779 receiving yards, a single-season record that stood for 30 years; and (3) Illinois fullback Jim Grabowski who was second in the NCAA with 1,258 rushing yards and won the 1965 Chicago Tribune Silver Football trophy after breaking the Big Ten Conference career rushing record.  Garrett, Twilley, and Grabowski also finished first, second, and third in the 1965 Heisman Trophy voting with 926, 528, and 481 points, respectively. All three were later inducted into the College Football Hall of Fame.

The 1965 Michigan State Spartans football team were ranked #1 in the final UPI Coaches Poll and led the country with eight players receiving at least one first-team All-American designation.  The Spartans' first-team honorees were: defensive back George Webster (AFCA, AP, NEA, UPI, FN, WC); defensive end Bubba Smith (AFCA, UPI, WC); end Gene Washington (CP, FN); quarterback Steve Juday (AP); running backs Clinton Jones (FWAA) and Bob Apisa (FN); middle guard Harold Lucas (NEA); and linebacker Ron Goovert (FWAA).

Purdue, ranked No. 13 in the final UPI Coaches' Poll, finished second with four first-team honorees: quarterback Bob Griese (AFCA, CP, NEA, UPI, FN, WC); defensive tackle Jerry Shay (AFCA, FN); offensive tackle Karl Singer (AP); and offensive end Bob Hadrick (FN). Notre Dame, Arkansas, and Nebraska tied for third place, each with three first-team selections.

Consensus All-Americans
The NCAA recognizes 22 players as "consensus" All-Americans for the 1965 season. The following chart identifies the consensus All-Americans and displays which first-team designations they received. The UPI's All-America team vote count (out of a possible 242) and Heisman Trophy point total, where applicable, is also included in the chart for each of the consensus All-Americans.

Offensive selections

Ends 

 Howard Twilley, Tulsa (College Football Hall of Fame)  (AFCA, AP-1, CP-1, FWAA-1, UPI-1, NEA-1, FN, Time, TSN, WC)
 Freeman White, Nebraska (AP-2, CP-3, FWAA-1, UPI-1,  NEA-1, FN, WC)
 Charles Casey, Florida (AFCA, AP-1, NEA-2, CP-3)
 Milt Morin, Massachusetts  (Time, TSN)
 Gene Washington, Michigan State (CP-1, UPI-2, FN [end])
 Bobby Crockett, Arkansas  (UPI-2, FWAA-1)
 Dave Williams, Washington (AP-2)
 Bob Hadrick, Purdue (CP-2, FN)
 Doug Moreau, LSU (FN)

Tackles 

 Sam Ball, Kentucky  (AFCA, AP-2, UPI-1, NEA-1, FWAA-1, Time, TSN, WC)
 Glen Ray Hines, Arkansas  (AFCA, AP-1, UPI-1, NEA-1, FWAA-1, FN, WC)  
 Francis Peay, Missouri (AP-2, CP-3, UPI-2, NEA-2, Time, TSN)
 Karl Singer, Purdue (AP-1)
 Tom Mack, Michigan (UPI-2, NEA-2)

Guards 

 Dick Arrington, Notre Dame  (AFCA, AP-1, CP-1, FWAA-1, UPI-1, NEA-1, FN, WC)
 Stas Maliszewski, Princeton (AP-2 [linebacker], CP-1, UPI-2, NEA-1, FN, WC)
 Doug Van Horn, Ohio State (AFCA, CP-2 [tackle], UPI-1)
 John Niland, Iowa (AP-2, Time, TSN)
 Stan Hindman, Mississippi (AP-2, CP-2, UPI-2, NEA-2, FN, Time, TSN)
 Wayne Foster, Washington State (FWAA-1, FN [tackle])
 Larry Gagner, Florida (FN, NBC)
 Tom Regner, Notre Dame (NEA-2)
 Paul Savidge, Princeton (CP-2)
 Joe Fratangelo, North Carolina (CP-3)

Centers 

 Paul Crane, Alabama (AFCA, AP-1, UPI-1, NEA-1, FWAA-1, WC)
 Pat Killorin, Syracuse (UPI-2, NEA-2 [guard], Time, TSN)

Quarterbacks 

 Bob Griese, Purdue (College and Pro Football Halls of Fame) (AFCA, CP-1, UPI-1, NEA-1, FN, WC)
 Steve Spurrier, Florida (AP-2, FWAA-1)
 Rick Norton, Kentucky (CP-2, Time, TSN)
 Steve Juday, Michigan State (AP-1, UPI-2)
 Gary Beban, UCLA (CP-3, NEA-2, FN)
 Steve Sloan, Alabama (FN)
 Billy Anderson, Tulsa (UPI-2)

Running backs 

 Mike Garrett, USC (College Football Hall of Fame) (AFCA, AP-1, CP-1, FWAA-1, UPI-1 [halfback], NEA-1 [halfback], FN [halfback], Time, TSN, WC) 
 Jim Grabowski, Illinois (College Football Hall of Fame) (AFCA, AP-1, CP-1, FWAA-1, UPI-1 [fullback], NEA-1 [fullback], FN [fullback], Time, TSN, WC)
 Donny Anderson, Texas Tech (College Football Hall of Fame) (AFCA, AP-1, CP-2, FWAA-1, UPI-1 [halfback], NEA-1 [FL], FN [halfback], Time, TSN, WC)
 Floyd Little, Syracuse (AP-2, UPI-2, NEA-2, CP-1, FWAA-1, FN [halfback])
 Clinton Jones, Michigan State (AP-2, CP-2, UPI-2, FWAA-1)
 Ray McDonald, Idaho (AP-2, NEA-2 [fullback])
 Harry Jones, Arkansas (NEA-2 [FL])
 Steve Bowman, Alabama (CP-2)
 Bill Wolski, Notre Dame (CP-3, FN [halfback])
 Ron Landeck, Princeton (CP-3)
 Tom Barrington, Ohio State (CP-3)
 Bob Apisa, Michigan State (FN [fullback])

Defensive selections

Defensive ends 

 Aaron Brown, Minnesota (AP-1, CP-2, FWAA-1, UPI-1, NEA-1, FN [end], Time, TSN, WC)
 Bubba Smith, Michigan State (College Football Hall of Fame) (AFCA, UPI-1, WC)
 Lynn Matthews, Florida (NEA-1)
 Ed Weisacosky, Miami (Fla.) (AP-1, NEA-2 [linebacker])
 Tony Jeter, Nebraska (AFCA, UPI-2, NEA-2 [offensive end])
 Ed Long, Dartmouth (AP-2)
 George Pearce, William and Mary (AP-2)
 Cas Banaszek, Northwestern (NEA-2)

Defensive tackles 

 Walt Barnes, Nebraska (AFCA, AP-1, UPI-2, NEA-1, FWAA-1, FN [tackle], Time, TSN, WC)
 Loyd Phillips, Arkansas (College Football Hall of Fame) (AFCA, AP-1, CP-1, UPI-1, NEA-2, FN [tackle]ɫ̩, WC)
 Bill Yearby, Michigan (AFCA, AP-2, CP-1, UPI-1, Time, TSN, WC)
 George Patton, Georgia (AP-1 [middle guard], UPI-2 [defensive end], NEA-2 [defensive end], FWAA-1, FN [tackle])
 George Rice, LSU (CP-2, Time, TSN)
 Jack Thornton, Auburn (NEA-1)
 Jerry Shay, Purdue (AFCA, CP-3, UPI-2, FN [tackle])
 John Richardson, UCLA (AP-2)
 Dick Van Horn, Ohio State (NEA-2)

Middle guards 

 Harold Lucas, Michigan State (CP-3 [guard], NEA-1 [middle guard])
 John Battle, Georgia Tech (AP-2 [middle guard])
 Jack Shinholser, Florida State (NEA-2 [middle guard])

Linebackers 

 Carl McAdams, Oklahoma (AFCA [linebacker], AP-1 [linebacker], CP-1 [center], UPI-1 [linebacker], NEA-1 [linebacker], FN [center], Time, TSN, WC)
 Tommy Nobis, Texas (College Football Hall of Fame) (AFCA, AP-1 [offensive end], CP-2 [center], FWAA-1, UPI-1, NEA-1, FN [guard], Time, TSN, WC)
 Frank Emanuel, Tennessee (College Football Hall of Fame) (AP-1, CP-3 [center], FWAA-1 [center], UPI-2, NEA-1, FN [guard], Time, TSN, WC)
 Ike Kelley, Ohio State (AP-1, UPI-1, FN [center])
 Ron Goovert, Michigan State (UPI-2, NEA-2, FWAA-1)
 Doug Buffone, Louisville (AP-2)
 Bill Cody, Auburn (AP-2, UPI-2, FN [center])
 Jim Lynch, Notre Dame (NEA-2)

Defensive backs 

 Nick Rassas, Notre Dame (AFCA, AP-1, UPI-1, NEA-1 [safety], FWAA-1, FN [halfback], Time, TSN, WC)
 Johnny Roland, Missouri (College Football Hall of Fame) (AFCA, AP-1, UPI-1, NEA-1, FWAA-1, FN [halfback], TSN, WC)
 George Webster, Michigan State (College Football Hall of Fame) (AFCA, AP-1, UPI-1, NEA-1, FN [roving back], WC)
 Bruce Bennett, Florida (UPI-1, NEA-2 [safety])
 Bill Clay, Mississippi (TSN)
 Charlie Brown, Syracuse (TSN)
 Ben Hawkins, Arizona State (AP-2, NEA-2, Time)
 Eric Crabtree, Pittsburgh (Time)
 Rodger Bird, Kentucky (Time)
 Frank Horak, Texas Christian (AP-2, UPI-2)
 Mike Weger, Bowling Green (AP-2)
 Willie Gaskins, Washington State (UPI-2, NEA-2)
 Larry Wachholtz, Nebraska (UPI-2)
 Jerry Mosher, California (UPI-2)

Special teams

Kicking specialist 

 Charlie Gogolak, Princeton (AP-1, FN)

Key 
 Bold – Consensus All-American>
 -1 – First-team selection
 -2 – Second-team selection
 -3 – Third-team selection

Official selectors
 AFCA = American Football Coaches Association, based on votes cast by over 500 members based on personal observations and "game films provided by the Eastman Kodak Company", with 1965 being the first year the AFCA voted on separate offensive and defensive units
 AP = Associated Press, based on recommendations from sports writers and broadcasters on eight regional boards appointed by the AP separate offensive and defensive units
 CP = Central Press Association, selected for the 35th year "with the aid of the captains of the major schools themselves", selections made without designation of separate offensive and defensive units
 FWAA = Football Writers Association of America, announced in Look magazine; selected without reference to offensive and defensive units
 NEA = Newspaper Enterprise Association, selections of separate offensive and defensive units
 UPI = United Press International, selected "by 242 sports writers and broadcasters in a nation-wide ballot"; separate offensive and defensive units

Other selectors
 FN = The Football News, consisting of 34 players selected by the paper's correspondents and staff members based upon personal observations and consultation with pro and college scouts, sportswriters and broadcasters
 Time = Time magazine
 TSN = The Sporting News
 WC = Walter Camp Football Foundation

See also
 1965 All-Atlantic Coast Conference football team
 1965 All-Big Ten Conference football team
 1965 All-Pacific Athletic Conference football team
 1965 All-SEC football team
 1965 All-Southwest Conference football team

References

All-America Team
College Football All-America Teams